North White Plains may refer to:

 North White Plains (Metro-North station), a railroad station in North Castle, New York
 North White Plains, a hamlet in North Castle, New York